immediations is an annual peer-reviewed academic journal in the history of art, published by the Courtauld Institute of Art, London.  The journal was established in 2004 by Louise Sørensen, John-Paul Stonard, and Linda Goddard.

immediations covers research on any period in the history of art by current or recent members of the postgraduate community of the Courtauld Institute of Art. immediations also publishes interviews with art historians, artists, conservators and curators, and transcripts of events held at The Courtauld Institute of Art Research Forum.

In 2009, immediations initiated an occasional series of period-specific, themed volumes with immediations Conference Papers 1: Art and Nature, Studies in Medieval Art and Architecture, edited by Laura Cleaver, Kathryn Gerry, and Jim Harris.

2014 marked the journal's tenth year, celebrated by a series of events including a Conference on 17 January 2015 at the Courtauld Institute of Art. The conference featured past contributors and editors, who discussed their current research or the ways in which the trajectory of their careers in the art world reflected their original contributions to immediations.

Editors
Previous editors-in-chief have been:
 2004–2006 Louise Sørensen
 2007 Scott Nethersole
 2008–2009 Jim Harris
 2010 Jocelyn Anderson, Katherine Faulkner, Jacopo Galimberti, Roo Gunzi, Jack Hartnell
 2011–2012 Katherine Faulkner
 2013 Marie Collier
 2014 Harriette Peel
 2015 Eva Bezverkhny and Maria Alessia Rossi
 2016 Thomas Hughes and Edwin Coomasaru
 2017 Maggie Crosland
 2018 Teresa Lane and Talitha Schepers
 2019 Ana-Maria Milcic and Harry Prance
 2020 Ambra D'Antone
Current editors-in-chief:
 2021 Bella Radenovic

External links
 

Art history journals
Publications established in 2004
Annual journals
English-language journals
Courtauld Institute of Art
2004 in art
2004 establishments in England